Robert Jenkins may refer to:

 Robert Jenkins (American football) (born 1963), Americanformer NFL player
 Robert Jenkins (Australian politician) (1814–1859), member of the New South Wales Legislative Council
 Robert Jenkins (master mariner) (fl. 1731–1745), English master mariner who sparked the War of Jenkins' Ear
 Robert Jenkins (Pennsylvania politician) (1769–1848), United States Congressman from Pennsylvania
 Robert Jenkins (British politician) (1900–1978), British Conservative Member of Parliament for Dulwich, 1951–1964
 Robert Harold Jenkins (1873–1939), Canadian politician
 Robert H. Jenkins Jr. (1948–1969), U.S. Marine Corps Medal of Honor recipient, killed in action in Vietnam
 Robert Thomas Jenkins (1881–1969), Welsh historian and academic
 Bob Jenkins (American football) (1923–2001), Consensus All-American football player
 Robert John Jenkins Junior (born 1966), computer professional
 Bob Jenkins (1947–2021), American sports announcer
Bob Jenkins, character in Almost Normal
 Charles Robert Jenkins (1940–2017), sometimes known as Robert Jenkins, U.S. soldier who defected to North Korea; husband of Hitomi Soga